Mattagunta is a village now part of Eluru district, Andhra Pradesh, India. It falls under Kalidindi Mandal.
Mattagunta village was part of united Krishna district, Andhra Pradesh, India, until 2022.

References 

Villages in Krishna district